Mary River Aerodrome  is an aerodrome that serves the Mary River Mine and is located adjacent to Mary River, Nunavut, Canada.

Airlines and destinations

References

Registered aerodromes in the Qikiqtaaluk Region